Glutathione peroxidase 6 (GPx-6) is an enzyme that in humans is encoded by the GPX6 gene.

This gene product belongs to the glutathione peroxidase family, which functions in the detoxification of hydrogen peroxide. It contains a selenocysteine (Sec) residue at its active site. The selenocysteine is encoded by the UGA codon, which normally signals translation termination. The 3' UTR of Sec-containing genes have a common stem-loop structure, the sec insertion sequence (SECIS), which is necessary for the recognition of UGA as a Sec codon rather than as a stop signal. Expression of this gene is restricted to embryos and adult olfactory epithelium.

References

Further reading

EC 1.11.1
Antioxidants
Selenoproteins